Antonius of Argos was a poet of ancient Greece. One of his epigrams is still extant in the Greek Anthology.

Notes

Ancient Greek epigrammatists
Epigrammatists of the Greek Anthology
Ancient Argives